The Marrakech Accords is a set of agreements reached at the 7th Conference of the Parties (COP7) to the United Nations Framework Convention on Climate Change, held in 2001, on the rules of meeting the targets set out in the Kyoto Protocol.
The separate Marrakech Declaration of 15 April 1994, manifesting the Uruguay Round trade agreements and establishing the World Trade Organization, was also concluded and signed in Marrakech, Morocco.

References

External links
The Marrakesh Accords & The Marrakesh Declaration - Draft
United Nations Framework Convention on Climate Change

United Nations Framework Convention on Climate Change
2001 in the environment